"I'm Doin' Fine Now" is a song by American R&B group New York City. Released in 1973, the song reached number 17 on the US Billboard Hot 100, number eight on the Billboard Easy Listening chart, number 20 on the UK Singles Chart and number 26 on the Canadian RPM Top Singles chart. It was the 46th most successful song of 1973 in the US.

Charts

Weekly charts

Year-end charts

The Pasadenas version

In 1992, British group the Pasadenas released a cover of the song, retitled "I'm Doing Fine Now", that peaked at number four in the United Kingdom for four weeks, selling over 200,000 copies in the process. The cover also reached the top 10 in Belgium, Greece, and Ireland.

Charts

Weekly charts

Year-end charts

Certifications

References

1973 debut singles
1973 songs
1992 singles
Columbia Records singles
The Pasadenas songs
RCA Records singles
Songs written by Thom Bell